Barbara Lee Cooper ( Ward; August 4, 1929 – October 25, 2022) was an American politician and a Democratic member of the Tennessee House of Representatives for the 86th District.

Biography
Cooper was born in the New Chicago area in the district of North Memphis. Cooper graduated from Manassas High School in Memphis, Tennessee. She also graduated from Tennessee State University, with a Bachelor of Science degree and a Master's degree in Education. She was a Memphis City Schools teacher. Cooper graduated with a Doctorate of Religious Philosophy in Christian psychology, from Jacksonville Theological Seminary (Jacksonville, Florida) in 1999.

Cooper later became involved in Memphis politics, serving as the chair of the African-American People's Organization. They organized a convention that aided W. W. Herenton's election as mayor of Memphis, Tennessee, in the 1991 election and encouraged civic engagement with the Shelby County Democratic Party.

In 1994, Cooper ran for the Tennessee House of Representatives in the 90th district, and lost to John DeBerry in the Democratic Party's primary election. Cooper ran for the 86th district seat in the Tennessee House to succeed Rufus E. Jones, who did not run for reelection, in 1996. Cooper won primary election out of nine candidates.

She was Vice Chair of the House Government Operations Committee. She served on the House Children and Family Affairs Committee, the House Education Committee, the House Family Justice Subcommittee and the House Higher Education Subcommittee.

Cooper died on October 25, 2022, at the age of 93. She was survived by her daughters, Reverend Joan Cooper Burnett and Tanya Cooper, and extended family. Barbara Cooper was predeceased by her son, Carl Cooper. Barbara Cooper posthumously won re-election in the 86th electoral district. The special election to complete her term was won by Democrat Justin Pearson.

Personal life and death 
In 1951, she married John D. Cooper, one of the first Black firemen in the Memphis Fire Department; they had three children. John D. Cooper died in 2006, after 55 years of marriage.

Cooper was a Catholic who attended St. Augustine Catholic Church.

References

External links

1929 births
2022 deaths
African-American Catholics
African-American state legislators in Tennessee
African-American women in politics
Politicians elected posthumously
Tennessee State University alumni
Democratic Party members of the Tennessee House of Representatives
Women state legislators in Tennessee
21st-century American politicians
21st-century American women politicians
Politicians from Memphis, Tennessee
21st-century African-American women
21st-century African-American politicians
20th-century African-American politicians
20th-century American politicians
20th-century African-American women
20th-century American women politicians